The Rad RXL is a British paramotor that was designed by John Radford and produced by Rad Aviation of Kidlington for powered paragliding. Now out of production, when it was available the aircraft was supplied complete and ready-to-fly.

Design and development
The RXL was designed with a focus on lightness. It was intended to comply with the US FAR 103 Ultralight Vehicles rules as well as European regulations. It features a paraglider-style wing, single-place accommodation and a single  Radne Raket 120 engine in pusher configuration with a 3:1 ratio reduction drive, recoil start and a  diameter three-bladed, ground adjustable, composite propeller. The aircraft chassis is built from a combination of high-tensile steel. An optional completely dismantle-able cage was a factory option to improve ground portability.

As is the case with all paramotors, take-off and landing is accomplished by foot. Inflight steering is accomplished via handles that actuate the canopy brakes, creating roll and yaw.

Specifications (RXL)

References

RXL
2000s British ultralight aircraft
Single-engined pusher aircraft
Paramotors